German submarine U-722 was a Type VIIC U-boat built for Nazi Germany's Kriegsmarine for service during World War II.
She was laid down on 21 December 1942 by H. C. Stülcken Sohn, Hamburg as yard number 788, launched on 21 September 1943 and commissioned on 15 December 1943 under Leutnant zur See Hans-Heinrich Reimers.

Design
German Type VIIC submarines were preceded by the shorter Type VIIB submarines. U-722 had a displacement of  when at the surface and  while submerged. She had two shafts and two  propellers.

U-722 was fitted with five  torpedo tubes (four fitted at the bow and one at the stern), fourteen torpedoes, one  SK C/35 naval gun, 220 rounds, and two twin  C/30 anti-aircraft guns. The boat had a complement of between forty-four and sixty.

Service history
The boat's career began with training at 31st U-boat Flotilla on 15 December 1943, followed by active service on 1 August 1944 as part of the 1st Flotilla. When the situation deteriorated for the Germans in France, following the invasion, she transferred to 11th Flotilla in Norway for the remainder of her service.

Wolfpacks
U-722 took part in no wolfpacks.

Fate
All hands were lost.

Summary of raiding history

See also
 Lt/Cdr Orme G. Stuart DSC RCNVR

References

Bibliography

External links

German Type VIIC submarines
1943 ships
U-boats commissioned in 1943
Ships lost with all hands
U-boats sunk in 1945
U-boats sunk by depth charges
U-boats sunk by British warships
World War II shipwrecks in the Atlantic Ocean
World War II submarines of Germany
Ships built in Hamburg
Maritime incidents in March 1945